The Ambassador of the United Kingdom to Moldova is the United Kingdom's foremost diplomatic representative in the Republic of Moldova, and head of the UK's diplomatic mission in Chișinău.  The official title is His Britannic Majesty's Ambassador to the Republic of Moldova.

After the dissolution of the Soviet Union in December 1991, Moldova was formally recognised as an independent state by the United Nations in March 1992. A new British ambassador to Russia, Sir Brian Fall, was appointed at that time and he was also accredited to nine former Soviet republics including Moldova. Fall's successor in Moscow, Sir Andrew Wood, was accredited to Moldova until 1999 when Richard Ralph was appointed ambassador for Romania and also to Moldova. When Ralph moved on in 2002 a resident ambassador to Moldova was appointed for the first time.

List of heads of mission

Ambassadors to Moldova
1992–1995: Sir Brian Fall (non-resident)
1995–1999: Sir Andrew Wood (non-resident)
1999–2002: Richard Ralph (non-resident) 
2002–2006: Bernard Whiteside
2006–2009: John Beyer
2009–2013: Keith Shannon
2013–2016: Philip Batson
2016–2019: Lucy Joyce

2019–:  Steven Fisher

References

External links
UK and Moldova, gov.uk

Moldova
 
United Kingdom